Anasimyia interpuncta is a European species of hoverfly.

Description

Habits

Distribution

References

Diptera of Europe
Eristalinae
Insects described in 1776
Taxa named by Moses Harris